The 2021–22 Senior Women's Challenger Trophy was the tenth edition of the Senior Women's Challenger Trophy, a women's limited overs competition in India. It took place from 4 to 9 December 2021. The tournament featured four teams, India A, India B, India C and India D, made up of the best players from across India. India A won the tournament, beating India D by three wickets in the final.

Competition format
The four teams played in a round-robin group, playing each other team once, with the top two advancing to the final. Matches were played using a 50 over format.

The group worked on a points system with positions within the group being based on the total points. Points were awarded as follows:

Win: 4 points. 
Tie: 2 points. 
Loss: 0 points.
No Result/Abandoned: 2 points.

If points in the final table were equal, teams were separated by their Net Run Rate.

Squads

Standings

Source: BCCI

Fixtures

Group stage

Final

Statistics

Most runs

Source: BCCI

Most wickets

Source: BCCI

References

Senior Women's Challenger Trophy
Domestic cricket competitions in 2021–22
2021 in Indian cricket